Samir Chamas (25 November 1942) is a Lebanese actor, writer, journalist and voice actor.

Personal life
Chamas has been married Siham Abu Al-Izz and he has two children, Rabih and Rima.

Filmography

Film 
{| class = "wikitable sortable" 
|-
!Year
!Title
!Role
!class = "unsortable" | Notes
!class = "unsortable" | Sources
|-
| 1964
| El Asam Al Murr
| 
|
|
|-
| 1985
|Gharo
| 
|
|
|-
| 1965
| Al Sharidan
| 
|
|
|-
| 1965
| Al Jakouar Al Sauda'''
| 
|
|
|-
| 1977
| Bint El-Harras| 
|
|
|-
| 1967
| Safar Brlk|
| 
|
|-
| 1967
| Share' El Dabab| 
|
|
|-
| 1968
| Thalath Nessa| Sami
|
|
|-
| 1969
| Kolena Feda'youn|
| 
|
|-
| 1971
| Amwaj| 
|
|
|-
| 1971
| Alem El Shohra| 
|
|
|-
| 1974
| Ajmal Ayam Hayati| 
|
|
|-
| 1983
| Bye Bye, Ya Helwa| 
|
|
|-
| 1983
| Samehni Ya Habibi| 
|
|
|-
| 1984
| Al Jiha Al Khamesa| 
|
|
|-
| 1984
| Hobi Alathi La Yamout| 
|
|
|-
| 1985
| Al Be'r| 
|
|
|-
| 1999
| Ayen El Shoq| 
|
|
|-
| 2000
| Mada Al Umr| 
|
|
|-
| 2001
| Africano| Mr. Joe
|
|
|-
| 2004
| Al Bahth An Al Hourrya| 
|
|
|}

 Television 

Spotlight. 2011
The Old Love - Abu Nadeem. 2011Al Armala W Al Shaytan. 2011Nos Darzan. 2009Tuff Incident. 2007Khataya Saghira. 2005Bayn El Sama Wal Ard. 2003
Face of the Moon. 2000
Arabic Language Club. 1998
The Adventure - Ramzi. 1978
The White Mask. 1974

 Dubbing roles 

 Mokhtarnameh - Muhammad ibn al-Hanafiyyah
 Planes - Skipper
 Planes: Fire & Rescue - Skipper
 The Smurfs - Papa Smurf (Image Production House version)

 Bibliography Einda Hafat al-Kawn''

References

External links 

 
 

1942 births
Living people
Lebanese male actors
Lebanese male film actors
Lebanese male television actors
Lebanese writers
Lebanese male voice actors
Lebanese journalists
Male actors from Beirut